Əhmədabad (also, Akhmedabad) is a village in the Goranboy Rayon of Azerbaijan. The village forms part of the municipality of Muzdurlar.

References 

Populated places in Goranboy District